The Men's Slalom in the 2018 FIS Alpine Skiing World Cup involved 11 events, including two parallel slaloms (both city events). The last race, at the World Cup finals in Åre, was cancelled due to high winds.

Marcel Hirscher of Austria won his fifth championship in the discipline, all in the prior six years, on the way to his seventh straight overall men's championship. 

The season was interrupted by the 2018 Winter Olympics from 12-24 February 2018 at Yongpyong Alpine Centre (slalom and giant slalom) at the Alpensia Sports Park in PyeongChang and at the Jeongseon Alpine Centre (speed events) in Jeongseon, South Korea.  The men's slalom was held on 22 February.

Standings

See also
 2018 Alpine Skiing World Cup – Men's summary rankings
 2018 Alpine Skiing World Cup – Men's Overall
 2018 Alpine Skiing World Cup – Men's Downhill
 2018 Alpine Skiing World Cup – Men's Super-G
 2018 Alpine Skiing World Cup – Men's Giant Slalom
 2018 Alpine Skiing World Cup – Men's Combined

References

External links
 Alpine Skiing at FIS website

Men's Slalom
FIS Alpine Ski World Cup slalom men's discipline titles